Sole Survivor also known as Dean Koontz's Sole Survivor is a Canadian Science Fiction Thriller film/mini-series adaptation of Dean Koontz's 1997 novel of the same name, made and released in 2000 and directed by Mikael Salomon.

Plot
After the death of his wife and daughter in a plane crash, a newspaper reporter named Joe Carpenter discovers that the crash may have been related to a nefarious scientific experiment involving children. A woman, Rose Tucker, who claims she was a survivor of the crash, approaches at his wife's grave. This leads into a plot by the Quartermass organization to capture her and a young girl she is protecting - the girl has the powers to heal and to transport. A villainous killer named Victor Yates and a young boy who can control minds from a distance lead the attack.

Tucker and Carpenter realize that Yates was once a CIA agent turned mercenary for the United States government, who was then hired to kill the scientists that were working on the projects at The Quartermass  Organization, genetically engineering children to become weapons for the next decade. He even starts to kill off witnesses who were investigating the crash that killed Joe's family, including members of the NTSB. Carpenter also realizes that his wife and daughter were the victims of an experiment gone wrong.

Donner, an agent for the Bureau, comes to their aid, after Joe needed someone to help him to get over the loss of his family. After meeting Donner, who may never see his friend again, they seek refuge at the home of one of the witnesses, the Ealings, who have met Tucker after she survived the crash.

After meeting the Ealings, Carpenter tries to sneak inside the Organization and save the children being held hostage. Joe and Tucker seek help from Tucker's associates to keep Yates of their trail, but ends up getting shot by one of Yates' men. Tucker dies of her injuries. Yates tells Carpenter that he didn't mean for anyone to get hurt during the plane crash and that he is not responsible for what had happened, telling Carpenter that his family was at the wrong place at the wrong time. Carpenter wants to kill him in revenge but needs his help to save the children.

Dewey, the psychic boy who destroyed the plane, kills Yates, as he now knows he would, forcing Yates to shoot himself and his fellow agent. Joe and the girl, who he names Nina after his late daughter, are on the run and the boy dies. However, the girl shows a vision to Carpenter where his wife and daughter say goodbye to him one last time and they love him very much. Having finally found closure, Carpenter thanks her and both of them start a new life elsewhere.

Differences between the novel and the film
In the novel the Ealings help Tucker with her injuries by taking her to the hospital, while in the film she dies of her injuries.

In the novel Yates is ambushed in the bathroom of the building by Carpenter, while in the film Yates is killed by Dewey, the boy with psychic powers.

Cast
 Billy Zane as Joe Carpenter
 Gloria Reuben as Rose Tucker
 Isabella Hofmann as Barbara Christman
 Rachel Victoria as "21-21"
 Mitchell Kosterman as Becker
 Wally Dalton as Jeff Ealing
 Christine Willes as Mercy Ealing
 Glenn Morshower as Robert Donner
 John C. McGinley as Victor Yates
 Dan Joffre as Dewey
 Susan Bain as Clarise Vadance

Awards
The film was nominated, in the company Academy of Science Fiction, Fantasy & Horror Films for a Saturn Award for Best Single Genre Television Presentation in 2001.

References

External links
 

2000 television films
2000 films
2000s science fiction thriller films
Canadian science fiction television films
Canadian science fiction thriller films
English-language Canadian films
2000s English-language films
Films about genetic engineering
Films about journalists
Films based on American novels
Films based on works by Dean Koontz
Films directed by Mikael Salomon
Films scored by Mark Snow
Canadian thriller television films
Films with screenplays by Richard Christian Matheson
2000s Canadian films